Gangneung Asan Hospital (강릉아산병원) is a tertiary referral hospital in Gangneung, South Korea. It was established by Asan Foundation and its founder Chung Ju-yung. It is the 2nd largest member hospital (825 beds) of Asan Health Network which consists of 8 hospitals including Asan Medical Center in Seoul since it opened in 1996. Gangneung Asan Hospital is one of teaching hospitals for University of Ulsan College of Medicine.

References

Teaching hospitals in South Korea
Hospitals established in 1996